Graveminder is a 2011 Gothic mystery novel by Melissa Marr. The novel was released on May 17, 2011 by William Morrow and Company and follows a young woman that returns to her hometown to discover that she is expected to fill the supernatural shoes of her now deceased grandmother. In 2011 Graveminder won the 2011 Goodreads Readers Choice Award for "Best Horror".

Synopsis

The book follows Rebekkah Barrow, a woman that returns to the small town of Claysville in order to attend the funeral of her grandmother Maylene. She remembers that Maylene always attended the funerals of each townsperson, always taking three sips from a flask and telling the dead to "sleep well and stay where I put you". Once back in Claysville, Rebekkah meets up with her old love interest Byron Montgomery and discovers that she is expected to perform the same ritual that her grandmother did for each funeral, as she is the new Graveminder. Not only is Rebekkah the new Graveminder, but Byron is her Undertaker and her helper in placing the dead back in their grave if the ritual is not performed exactly right. When performed incorrectly or not at all, the dead will walk the earth in an attempt to fulfill their hungers, which is exactly what happens. Rebekkah is soon drawn into a web of secrets, bargains, secret worlds, and murder that threatens to ruin the peace of those in Claysville.

Characters 
Rebekkah Barrow
Byron Montgomery
William Montgomery
Elaine 
Amity Blue 
Cecilia "Cissy" Barrow
Troy
 Daisha
Maylene Barrow
 Chris the Sheriff
 Bonnie Jean Blue
 Nicolas Whittaker
 Mr. D or Charlie or Charles
Alicia Barrow
Ward

Reception
Critical reception for Graveminder was mostly positive, garnering positive reviews from NPR and Publishers Weekly. A reviewer for the Independent remarked that the book was "lifeless" while the Journal Gazette remarked that the book had "repetitive conversations [that] suck some of the energy out of the plot" but gave an overall positive review. USA Today and Kirkus Reviews both praised the entry, with USA Today calling it "a creatively creepy gothic tale for grown-ups".

Awards
 2011, Goodreads Readers Choice Award, "Best Horror"

References

External links
Official author page for Graveminder

Urban fantasy novels
2011 American novels
Novels set in the 2010s
Southern Gothic novels
William Morrow and Company books